8-Cyclopentyl-1,3-dipropylxanthine (DPCPX, PD-116,948) is a drug which acts as a potent and selective antagonist for the adenosine A1 receptor. It has high selectivity for A1 over other adenosine receptor subtypes, but as with other xanthine derivatives DPCPX also acts as a phosphodiesterase inhibitor, and is almost as potent as rolipram at inhibiting PDE4. It has been used to study the function of the adenosine A1 receptor in animals, which has been found to be involved in several important functions such as regulation of breathing and activity in various regions of the brain, and DPCPX has also been shown to produce behavioural effects such as increasing the hallucinogen-appropriate responding produced by the 5-HT2A agonist DOI, and the dopamine release induced by MDMA, as well as having interactions with a range of anticonvulsant drugs.

See also 
 DMPX
 CPX
 Xanthine

References 

Adenosine receptor antagonists
Phosphodiesterase inhibitors
Xanthines
Cyclopentanes
Propyl compounds